Mitromorpha wilhelminae is a species of minute sea snail, a marine gastropod mollusk or micromollusk in the family Mitromorphidae.

Description
The length of the shell varies between 6 mm and 9 mm.

Distribution
This marine species occurs in the Strait of Gibraltar; off Southern Spain and Morocco

References

 van Aartsen, J.J.; Menkhorst, H.P.M.G.; Gittenberger, E. (1984). The marine mollusca of the Bay of Algeciras, Spain, with general notes on Mitrella, Marginellidae and Turridae. Basteria. Supplement 2: 1–135.

External links
 Amati B., Smriglio C. & Oliverio M. (2015). Revision of the Recent Mediterranean species of Mitromorpha Carpenter, 1865 (Gastropoda, Conoidea, Mitromorphidae) with the description of seven new species. Zootaxa. 3931(2): 151–195
 
 

wilhelminae
Gastropods described in 1984